Mahmoud Ezzat (September 11, 1913 – November 17, 1974) was an Egyptian boxer. He competed in the 1936 Summer Olympics. He died of injuries following a car accident in 1974.

Career
In 1936, Ezzat was eliminated in the second round of the flyweight class, after having lost his fight to William Passmore.

References

1913 births
1974 deaths
Flyweight boxers
Olympic boxers of Egypt
Boxers at the 1936 Summer Olympics
Egyptian male boxers
Road incident deaths in Egypt
20th-century Egyptian people